Mangora gibberosa is a species of spider in the family Araneidae, found in North America. It is commonly misidentified as C. turbinata due to its similar appearance and orb-style webs.

References

Araneidae
Spiders described in 1847
Spiders of North America